Fisherostylus bruneri is a species of beetle in the family Cerambycidae, the only species in the genus Fisherostylus.

References

Acanthocinini